There's Always Another Girl is the 11th solo studio album by Juliana Hatfield, released August 30, 2011. It was created with the monetary contribution of Hatfield's fans through Pledgemusic and those who supported the project received the album a month early on July 27, 2011. The title track was originally subtitled and/or dedicated "(For Lindsay Lohan)" when streamed through Stereogum on May 12, 2009.

Track listing
all songs written by Juliana Hatfield

Personnel
 Juliana Hatfield – vocals, guitars, bass, keyboards, percussion
 Ed Valauskas – bass
 Pete Caldes – drums
 Rafi Sofer – special backwards effects and noises

Production
 Engineer: Rafi Sofer
 Mastering: Jonathan Wyner at M Works
 Design: Jay Walsh
 Nude photo: Jay Walsh
 Plant photo: Juliana Hatfield
 Concepts: Juliana Hatfield

References

2011 albums
Juliana Hatfield albums